The 1988 United States Olympic trials for swimming events were held from August 8 to 13 in Austin, Texas.  It was the qualifying meet for American swimmers who hoped to compete at the 1988 Summer Olympics in Seoul.

Results 
Key:

Men's events

Women's events 

 Angel Martino originally won the respective events, and set the American record in the 50- and 100-meter freestyle. However, Martino was removed from the Olympic team (along with her results being purged) after she tested positive for nandralone. Martino claimed the positive drug test was a result of birth control usage.

See also
United States at the 1988 Summer Olympics
United States Olympic Trials (swimming)
USA Swimming

References

External links
  1988 US Olympic swimming trials report at Usaswimming.org (provided by Swimming World Magazine)

United States Olympic trials
United States Summer Olympics Trials
Swimming Olympic trials
United States Olympic trials swimming
United States Olympic Trials (swimming)